Dhoom Dadakka is a 2008 Indian-Pakistani Hindi-language comedy drama film directed by Shashi Ranjan and starring Anupam Kher, Gulshan Grover, Satish Kaushik and Satish Shah.

Cast 
Anupam Kher as Mungilal 
Gulshan Grover as Fursat Lala
Satish Kaushik as Johnny English
Satish Shah as Jignesh 
Sammir Dattani as Ranbir 
Shaad Randhawa as Rahul
Aarti Chhabria as Shivani Sawant
Bhavana Balsavar as Mungilal's sister
Zac as Zac
Shama Sikander 
Jackie Shroff in a guest appearance

Production 
The film is an Indian-Pakistan production. Shama Sikander returns after a hiatus in a glamorous role. Anupam Kher, Gulshan Grover and Satish Kaushik sang a Holi song in the film.

Soundtrack

Reception 
A critic from The Times of India wrote that "Despite of three big dadas of comedy - Anupam Kher, Satish Shah, Satish Kaushik - sharing celluloid space in a single film, the outcome is not as expected". Taran Adarsh, writing for Bollywood Hungama stated that "On the whole, DHOOM DADAKKA could've been a decent timepass flick, but it misses the bus". Rajeev Masand of CNN-IBN opined that "No prizes for guessing, I’m going with zero out of five for director Shashi Ranjan’s Dhoom Dadakka, it’s a showcase for some of the worst acting you’re likely to see at the movies in a long, long time". Ameeta Gupta of Rediff.com rated the film two-and-a-half out of five stars and said that "Not a movie for all unless comedy is your poison".

References 

2008 comedy-drama films